Gowtam Tinnanuri is an Indian film director and screenwriter who works predominantly in Telugu films.

Filmography

Awards and nominations

References

External links 
 

Year of birth missing (living people)
Living people
Indian film directors
Telugu film directors
Telugu screenwriters
People from Rajahmundry
Film directors from Andhra Pradesh
Screenwriters from Andhra Pradesh
National Film Award (India) winners